The 2015 Dunlop Srixon World Challenge was a professional tennis tournament played on indoor carpet courts. It was the eighth edition of the tournament and part of the 2015 ATP Challenger Tour and 2015 ITF Women's Circuit, offering a total of $75,000+H (ITF) and $40,000+H (ATP) in prize money. It took place in Toyota, Japan, on 23–29 November 2015.

Men's singles main-draw entrants

Seeds 

 1 Rankings as of 16 November 2015.

Other entrants 
The following players received wildcards into the singles main draw:
  Sora Fukuda
  Sho Katayama
  Makoto Ochi
  Yusuke Watanuki

The following player received protected ranking entry to the main draw:
  Greg Jones

The following players received entry from the qualifying draw:
  Itsuki Imina
  Yuya Kibi
  Benjamin Mitchell
  Keisuke Watanuki

Women's singles main-draw entrants

Seeds 

 1 Rankings as of 16 November 2015.

Other entrants 
The following players received wildcards into the singles main draw:
  Ksenia Lykina
  Makoto Ninomiya
  Yuuki Tanaka
  Aiko Yoshitomi

The following players received entry from the qualifying draw:
  Haruka Kaji
  Nicha Lertpitaksinchai
  Nudnida Luangnam
  Cristina Sánchez Quintanar

Champions

Men's singles

 Yoshihito Nishioka def.  Alexander Kudryavtsev 6–3, 6–4

Women's singles

 Jana Fett def.  Luksika Kumkhum 6–4, 4–6, 6–4

Men's doubles

 Brydan Klein /  Matt Reid def.  Riccardo Ghedin /  Yi Chu-huan 6–2, 7–6(7–3)

Women's doubles

 Akiko Omae /  Peangtarn Plipuech def.  Luksika Kumkhum /  Yuuki Tanaka 3–6, 6–0, [11–9]

External links 
 2015 Dunlop World Challenge at ITFtennis.com
 Official website 

 
2015 ITF Women's Circuit
2015 ATP Challenger Tour
2015
2015 in Japanese tennis
November 2015 sports events in Japan